Crematogaster alluaudi is a species of ant in tribe Crematogastrini. It was described by Emery in 1893.

References

alluaudi
Insects described in 1893